Tientsin Mystic  is a 2017 Chinese television series based on the novel He Shen (河神1·鬼水怪谈) by Tianxia Bachang. It is produced by iQiyi, and stars actors Li Xian, Zhang Ming'en, Wang Zixuan and Chen Yumi. The first season aired on iQiyi on July 19, 2017, and Netflix in 2018. The series won a Silver Medal for Best Visual Effects & a Bronze Medal for Best Direction at the 2018 New York Festivals World's Best TV & Films Competition.

In September 2018, iQiyi and Kongfu Pictures announced that a second season is currently under pre-production. The second season began filming on November 20, 2018, with Jin Shijia replacing Li Xian as the lead actor. Season 2 is streaming now with multi-languages subtitles on iQIYI.

Synopsis 
Set in the 1920s Republican era, flooding ravages the land of Tianjin and conjures up numerous strange tales about the river. Guo Deyou is a part of the river salvage team, who retrieves bodies from the water. His master is nicknamed 'Old River God'; as the 'Little River God', Deyou has inherited his ability to use tobacco to uncover the truth, however, his body cannot handle smoke in large amounts. He ends up being suspected for the murder of a distinguished chairman, whose son Ding Mao, a trained forensic investigator, joins forces with him to uncover the truth. With their female partners - Gu Ying, the daughter of a sorceress and Deyou's childhood friend, and Xiao Lan-lan, a journalist, whose father is a rich local businessman - they begin an investigation that leads them to an incident twenty years ago, and a cult whose presence is still affecting the city in increasingly sinister ways.

Cast 
Li Xian as Guo Deyou
Zhang Ming'en as Ding Mao
Wang Zixuan as Gu Ying
Chen Yumi as Xiao Lanlan

Soundtrack 
The series' soundtracks are sang by Jam Hsiao and lead actress Wang Zixuan.

Reception
The series received critical acclaim for its exciting plot, suspenseful storyline and high quality production. It also received positive reviews for its faithful and skillful adaptation from a novel, by successfully keeping the "essence" of the original novel while also leveraging its content and characters. It has a score of 8.1 on Douban, and over 2 billion views online.
China Daily named Tientsin Mystic as one of the series which marks big improvement of quality of Chinese web series in 2017.

Accolades

Censorship
The drama was briefly taken off air in February 2018 from iQiyi.

References 

2017 Chinese television series debuts
IQIYI original programming
Chinese web series
Television shows based on Chinese novels
Television series by iQiyi Pictures